York railway station is a disused station on the Eastern Railway in Western Australia. It is located in the town of York.

History
The York station opened on 29 June 1885 as the interim terminus of the Eastern Railway when it was extended from Chidlow's Well. York became a junction station with a line opened south to Beverley on 5 August 1886 to connect with the Great Southern Railway from Albany.

On 29 June 1885, Walkinshaw Cowan was invited to give a speech at the extension of the railway line to York.  He said:

The single fare from Perth to York was 5 shillings and the return fare was 7 shillings and sixpence.

The Bruce Rock line opened east to Greenhills on 1 September 1898, being extended to Quairading on 24 April 1908 and Bruce Rock on 28 March 1913. It was cut back to Quairading in the 1990s and closed entirely in October 2013.

When the Eastern Railway was extended to Southern Cross in 1894, it was done so via Northam rather than York even though it was the largest inland town in Western Australia at the time. In 1906, the station was extended. In 1977, it was classified by the National Trust.

The Albany Progress utilised the station until the service ceased in December 1978.

Railway Station Master’s Quarters 

The Railway Station Master’s Quarters were designed by George Temple-Poole and would have been one his first buildings after he was appointed as Principal Architect in June 1885.

The building is possibly the earliest example of Federation Arts and Crafts style in Australia, emulating William Morris, for whom the ideal in house design was to copy the “ageless domestic architecture” of Bibury in Gloucestershire, a Cotswald hamlet.   Temple-Poole has designed the Railway Station Quarters like a Cotswald cottage:
 small in scale, homely and domestic
 using two locally made materials with contrasting colours and textures, stone and brick
 high pitched roofs 
 irregular positioned windows 
 taller than usual chimneys
 protruding eaves
 twin gables

The building is now a private residence.

References

External links
York Station History of Western Australian Railways & Stations gallery

Disused railway stations in Western Australia
Eastern Railway (Western Australia)
Railway station
Railway stations in Australia opened in 1885
Railway stations closed in 1978
Railway station
State Register of Heritage Places in the Shire of York